Malmea cuspidata is a species of plant in the Annonaceae family. It is endemic to Peru.

References

Flora of Peru
Annonaceae
Vulnerable plants
Taxonomy articles created by Polbot